After Midnight is a 1957 jazz album by "Nat King Cole and his trio" on Capitol Records.   It peaked at #13 on the U.S. Billboard Pop Albums chart. The Penguin Guide to Jazz listed the album as part of its suggested “core collection”.

Release history
Initially, the album was released in a 33rpm LP version as well as in a set of four (7 inch) 45rpm discs.  In 1987, five previously unreleased tracks recorded at the same original sessions were added as bonus tracks to the Capitol Records CD re-release titled, The Complete After Midnight Sessions.  Some later re-issues, under the title, After Midnight, The Complete Session or simply, After Midnight, also include one or more alternate take(s) with the 17 songs from the original 1956 recording sessions.  There are also at least three other reissues with 18, 19 and 21 tracks.

Track listing

LP release
LP side A:
 "Just You, Just Me" (Greer, Klages) – 3:00
 "Sweet Lorraine" (Burwell, Parish) – 4:33
 "Sometimes I'm Happy" (Caesar, Youmans) – 4:11
 "Caravan" (Ellington, Mills, Tizol) – 2:45
 "It's Only a Paper Moon" (Arlen, Harburg, Rose) – 3:06
 "You're Looking at Me" (Troup) – 4:12
LP side B:
 "Lonely One" (Hambro, Heller) – 3:45
 "Don't Let It Go to Your Head" (Hadamik, LaVere, Nast) – 3:11
 "I Know That You Know" (Caldwell, Youmans) – 2:28
 "Blame It on My Youth" (Levant, Heyman) – 4:06
 "When I Grow Too Old to Dream" (Hammerstein, Romberg) – 4:33
 "(Get Your Kicks on) Route 66" (Troup) – 3:41
At least one source seems to indicate the initial release did not contain "Sometimes I'm Happy (Sometimes I'm Blue)" and "When I Grow Too Old to Dream"

Four 7 inch 45rpm discs release
Disc 1
A1. "Sometimes I'm Happy (Sometimes I'm Blue)"
B1. "Just You, Just Me"
B2. "When I Grow Too Old to Dream"
Disc 2
C1. "Lonely One"
C2. "I Know That You Know"
D1. "Sweet Lorraine"
Disc 3
E1. "You're Looking At Me"
F1. "Caravan"
F2. "(Get Your Kicks on) Route 66"
Disc 4
G1. "It's Only a Paper Moon"
G2. "Don't Let It Go To Your Head"
H1. "Blame It On My Youth"

1987 CD release, The Complete After Midnight Sessions
 "Just You, Just Me
 "Sweet Lorraine"
 "Sometimes I'm Happy (Sometimes I'm Blue)"
 "Caravan"
 "It's Only a Paper Moon"
 "You're Looking at Me"
 "Lonely One"
 "Don't Let It Go to Your Head"
 "I Know That You Know"
 "Blame It on My Youth"
 "When I Grow Too Old to Dream"
 "(Get Your Kicks on) Route 66"
Bonus tracks (taken from the same 1956 recording sessions):
 "I Was a Little Too Lonely (And You Were a Little Too Late)" (Evans, Livingston) – 3:02
 "You Can Depend on Me" (Carpenter, Dunlap, Hines) – 3:55
 "What Is There to Say?" (Duke, Harburg) – 3:37
 "Two Loves Have I" (Murray, Scotto, Trivers) – 2:47
 "Candy" (David, Kramer, Whitney) – 3:54

Personnel
Nat King Cole – piano, vocals
John Collins – guitar
Charlie Harris – bass
Lee Young – drums
Willie Smith – alto saxophone on "Just You, Just Me," "You're Looking at Me," "Don't Let it Go to Your Head" and "I Was a Little Too Lonely"
Harry Edison – trumpet on "Sweet Lorraine," "It's Only a Paper Moon," "Route 66," "You Can Depend on Me" and "Candy"
Juan Tizol – trombone on "Caravan," "Lonely One," "Blame It on My Youth" and "What is There to Say"
Stuff Smith – violin on "Sometimes I'm Happy," "I Know That You Know," "When I Grow Too Old to Dream" and "Two Loves Have I"
Jack Costanzo – bongos on "Caravan" and "Lonely One"

Release information
 Capitol Records W-782 (33rpm LP)
 Capitol Records EAP-782 (album of four 7 inch 45rpm discs)
 Capitol Records CDP 7 48328 2 (1987 Compact Disc, The Complete After Midnight Sessions)
 Blue Note 20087 (1999 Compact Disc, After Midnight, the Complete Session)
 Analogue Productions CAPP 782 SA (2010 hybrid mono SACD, After Midnight)
 Analogue Productions AAPP 782–45 (2010 45rpm 12 inch LPs (x3), After Midnight)

References

External links
 "Nat King Cole: 'After Midnight,' 'Best of the Nat King Cole Trio' (Blue Note & First Choice)", Commentary by A. B. Spellman and Murray Horwitz for NPR's "Basic Jazz Record Library"

Nat King Cole albums
1957 albums
Capitol Records albums
Albums recorded at Capitol Studios